Franck Langolff (1948 – 8 November 2006) was a French composer and guitarist.

1948 births
2006 deaths
French composers
French male composers
French guitarists
French male guitarists
People from Fez, Morocco
20th-century French musicians
20th-century guitarists
20th-century French male musicians